Ruth Whitman (May 28, 1922 – December 1, 1999) was an American poet, translator, and professor.

Career 
Whitman received a B.A. and an M.A. from Radcliffe College, and also taught at Radcliffe, and at Massachusetts Institute of Technology.

Her eighth and last book is Hatshepshut, Speak to me (Wayne State University Press, 1992), and her most well-known and well-regarded is Tamsen Donner: A Woman’s Journey.

She also translated poetry from Yiddish, and wrote the beloved poem Sisters.

Her honors and awards include a Senior Fulbright Writer-in-Residence Fellowship to Hebrew University of Jerusalem, a Bunting Institute Fellowship, and a National Endowment for the Arts Literature Fellowship. She won a 1969 National Jewish Book Award in the English Poetry category for The Marriage Wig and Other Poems.

Her poems were published in literary journals and magazines including AGNI and Ploughshares. She was an early cooperative member of Alice James Books, and was the poetry editor for Radcliffe Quarterly from 1980 - 1995.

Her papers are held at the Hollis Archives at Harvard Library.

Personal life
The oldest daughter of Meyer David and Martha H. Bashein, né Sherman, Whitman was born on May 28, 1922, in New York City.

At the time of her death, she lived in Middletown, Rhode Island, and was married to Morton Sacks, a painter, and had three children, Rachel, Lee, and David.

Her first marriage was to Cedric Whitman and her second to Firman Houghton.

Published works
Full-length Poetry Collections
 Hatshepshut, Speak to me (Wayne State University Press, 1992)
 Laughing Gas: Poems, New and Selected, 1963-1990 (Wayne State University Press, 1990)
 The testing of Hanna Senesh (Wayne State University Press, 1986, with a historical background by Livia Rothkirchen)
 Permanent Address (Alice James Books, 1980)
 Tamsen Donner: A Woman's Journey (Alice James Books, 1977)
 The Passion of Lizzie Borden (October House, 1973)
 The Marriage Wig and Other Poems (Harcourt, Brace & World, 1968)
 Blood & Milk Poems (Clarke & Way, 1963)

Translations
 The selected poems of Jacob Glatstein (October House, 1972)
 An anthology of modern Yiddish poetry (October House, 1966)

Non-fiction
 Becoming a Poet: Source, Process, Practice'' (The Writer, Inc., 1982)

References

Sources
 Library of Congress Online Catalog > Ruth Whitman

External links
 Alice James Books > Author Page > Ruth Whitman
 Wayne State University Press > Author Page > Ruth Whitman
 Jewish Women's Archive > Jewish Women: A Comprehensive Encyclopedia > Ruth Whitman, 1922 – 1999 > by Sylvia Rothchild
 Sylvia Rothchild, Biography of Ruth Whitman, Jewish Women Encyclopedia
Papers of Ruth Whitman, 1930-1998 (inclusive), 1940-1996 (bulk): A Finding Aid. Schlesinger Library, Radcliffe Institute, Harvard University.

1922 births
1999 deaths
20th-century American poets
MIT School of Humanities, Arts, and Social Sciences faculty
National Endowment for the Arts Fellows
Radcliffe College alumni
Radcliffe College faculty
Writers from New York (state)
Writers from Rhode Island
American women poets
20th-century American women writers
20th-century American translators
American writers
Fulbright alumni